Len Brown (2 November 1910 – 8 August 1983) was an  Australian rules footballer who played with North Melbourne in the Victorian Football League (VFL).

Notes

External links 

1910 births
1983 deaths
Australian rules footballers from Victoria (Australia)
North Melbourne Football Club players